Filip Anđušić (born 22 January 2002) is a Montenegrin professional basketball player  for Podgorica of the Prva A Liga and the ABA League Second Division.

Early life and career 
Anđušić grew up playing basketball with a local club prior he joined a youth system of a Serbian club Vizura in 2016. Three years later, he joined the Crvena zvezda youth system.

Professional career 
On 1 February 2020, Anđušić officially signed a four-year professional contract with Crvena zvezda. Afterwards, he was loaned to Tamiš for the 2020–21 BLS season, and to Slodes for the 2021–22 BLS season.

On 26 July 2022, Anđušić signed for Podgorica.

National team career 
In August 2018, Anđušić was a member of the Montenegro under-16 team that finished 14th at the FIBA U16 European Championship in Novi Sad, Serbia. Over seven tournament games, he averaged 10.1 points and 5.6 rebounds per game. In July/August 2019, Anđušić was a member of the Montenegro national under-18 team that finished 12th at the FIBA U18 European Championship in Volos, Greece. Over six tournament games, he averaged 2.5 points, 3.7 rebounds, and one assist per game. In July 2022, Anđušić was a member of the Montenegro under-20 team that won a bronze medal at the FIBA U20 European Championship in Podgorica, Montenegro. Over seven tournament games, he averaged 11 points and 8.7 rebounds per game.

References

External links 
 Profile at realgm.com
 Profile at eurobasket.com
 Profile at aba-liga.com

2002 births
Living people
Basketball League of Serbia players
Centers (basketball)
KK Crvena zvezda youth players
KK Slodes players
KK Podgorica players
KK Tamiš players
Montenegrin expatriate basketball people in Serbia
Montenegrin men's basketball players
Power forwards (basketball)
Sportspeople from Pljevlja